Kary is a ghost town in Mellette County, in the U.S. state of South Dakota.

History
A post office called Kary was established in 1925, and remained in operation until 1946. The town has the name of a local family.

References

Ghost towns in South Dakota
Geography of Mellette County, South Dakota